Brahma is a 1994 Indian Hindi-language film directed by K. Subash and produced by S. Ramanathan. The film stars Govinda, Madhoo and Ayesha Jhulka. It is a remake of Subash's 1991 Tamil film Bramma.

Plot
Suraj (Govinda) has a unique skill of looking at a child and making a painting of how that child would look after growing up. One day, he is approached by a person with the photo of a girl child and is asked to paint the photo of how she would look when she grows up. He starts the work sincerely, just to realise the motive behind this request. His client wants to find the girl, who is now grown up, and kill her in order to become rich.

Suraj wants to help the girl. To put the killers offtrack, he instead paints the face of his dead wife.

What follows is a plot with lots twists and turns.

Cast
 Govinda as Suraj
 Madhoo as Chanda
 Ayesha Jhulka as Asha
 Prem Chopra as Janakraj
 Laxmikant Berde as Timepass
 Aruna Irani as Jamunabai
 Satyendra Kapoor as DSP
 Tinnu Anand as Lawyer
 Asrani as Police Constable
 Arjun as Sunder

Soundtrack
Songs were written by Prayag Raj.

References

External links

1990s Hindi-language films
1994 films
Films scored by Bappi Lahiri
Hindi remakes of Tamil films
Films directed by K. Subash